is a role-playing video game developed and published by Sega for the Nintendo 3DS. It was released in Japan on March 20, 2014. A sequel, Hero Bank 2, was released in Japan on November 27, 2014. An anime television series adaptation by TMS Entertainment began airing from April 7, 2014 and ended on March 30, 2015.

Plot
In this world, players participate in "Hero Battles" using Bankfon Gs, which allows them to rent powerful hero suits and fight battles against other players, receiving power boosts from the public. Kaito Gōshō, a young elementary school student who is always eager to help others, ends up hastily signing a contract to rent the powerful hero suit, Enter the Gold, from a mysterious priest named Sennen. However, he soon learns that this suit comes with a debt with 10 billion yen, which Kaito must now pay back by winning Hero Battles.

Characters

The main protagonist, a hot-headed elementary school student who sports a regent hairdo and is known for making all sorts of crude jokes. He is the company president of the Gappori Company, which helps out others with various tasks. He obtains the powerful hero suit  from Sennen, but winds up with a 10 billion yen debt as a result.

Gappori Company's 'head of whatever' (or "Jack of all trades" to be more accurate) who often feels inferior to Kaito. Wanting to surpass him, he forms a contract with the Money Ghost, erasing his previous identity and granting him the power hero suit, .

.

Gappori Company's managing director who is short and wears swirly glasses.

He has a pet mouse named  who can predict the future, with Fukuta being the only one who can translate his readings.

A Pig.

A mysterious priest who gave Kaito his Enter the Gold suit, along with his massive debt.
 

A mysterious being who gave Nagare his The Dominion Dollar suit. He is soon revealed be Sumimori Adachi, the creator of Hero Battles, who vows revenge against money for the evils it has done.

Kaito's elder sister.

Kaito's grandfather.

A passionate boy who works in Big Money Bay's fishing district.

The son of a factory owner in Iron Town. As a result of protecting his father from an explosion, most of his body has been replaced with robotic parts.

A bulky bully type who has a crush on Ai.

The head of the Cyber Emperor company, which seeks to pave over the industrial parts of town. He uses the hero suit . He is defeated by Kaito and his company ends up bankrupt.

A Hero Bank researcher who works alongside Sennen in fighting against Money Ghost.

A TV reporter, whose name Kaito often mispronounces.

Media

Video games
The video game, developed and published by Sega, was released in Japan on March 20, 2014. An arcade game has also been produced. A sequel, Hero Bank 2, was released on November 27, 2014.

Anime

An anime television series produced by TMS Entertainment began airing in Japan from April 7, 2014 and is being simulcast by Crunchyroll.

See also
Rent a Hero

References

External links
Official website 

2014 video games
Japanese children's animated action television series
Japan-exclusive video games
Nintendo 3DS games
Nintendo 3DS eShop games
Nintendo 3DS-only games
Sega Games franchises
Sega video games
TMS Entertainment
TV Tokyo original programming
Anime television series based on video games
Video games developed in Japan